Alcanivorax mobilis  is a Gram-negative, hydrocarbon-degrading and motile bacterium from the genus of Alcanivorax which has been isolated from deep-sea sediments from the Indian Ocean.

References

Oceanospirillales
Bacteria described in 2018